WAMD may refer to:

 WAMD (AM), a radio station (970 AM) licensed to Aberdeen, Maryland, United States
 WAMD (Minneapolis), a defunct radio station in Minneapolis, Minnesota, United States